is the fourteenth single of J-Pop idol group Morning Musume. It was released on February 21, 2002 and sold a total of 443,630 copies. The B-side is a re-recorded and re-arranged version of the band's their first single, "Morning Coffee", featuring the then-current lineup. The single peaked at number one on the Oricon Charts. The single was first single for the group of the year 2002

Track listing 
All lyrics are composed by Tsunku. Released as a double-A single and a Single V DVD.

CD 
 
 
 "Sōda! We're Alive" (Instrumental)

Single V DVD

Members at the time of single 
1st generation: Kaori Iida, Natsumi Abe
2nd generation: Kei Yasuda, Mari Yaguchi
3rd generation: Maki Goto
4th generation: Rika Ishikawa, Hitomi Yoshizawa, Nozomi Tsuji, Ai Kago
5th generation: Ai Takahashi, Asami Konno, Makoto Ogawa, Risa Niigaki

External links 
Sōda! We're Alive entry at Up-Front Works official website

Morning Musume songs
Zetima Records singles
2002 singles
Oricon Weekly number-one singles
Songs written by Tsunku
Song recordings produced by Tsunku
Japanese-language songs
Dance-pop songs
Japanese synth-pop songs
Fight songs